Sarah Elizabeth Lovell (born 9 October 1980) is an Australian politician. She has been the Labor member for Rumney in the Tasmanian Legislative Council since the 2017 periodic elections.

Lovell was a union representative for United Voice before standing for Rumney. She defeated the incumbent MLC, independent Tony Mulder, to win the seat.

References

1980 births
Living people
Members of the Tasmanian Legislative Council
Australian Labor Party members of the Parliament of Tasmania
21st-century Australian politicians
Women members of the Tasmanian Legislative Council
21st-century Australian women politicians
People from Springvale, Victoria
Politicians from Melbourne
Australian women trade unionists
Trade unionists from Melbourne